Franklin E. Zimring is an American criminologist, law professor, and the William G. Simon Professor of Law at the UC Berkeley School of Law.

Early life and education
Zimring was born on December 2, 1942 in Los Angeles, California, to television and film writer Maurice Zimring, better known by his stage name Maurice Zimm, and his wife Molly, a lawyer who passed the California Bar in 1933. After graduating from Los Angeles Public Schools, he received his B.A. with distinction from Wayne State University in 1963 and his J.D. cum laude from the University of Chicago in 1967.

Career
Zimring joined the faculty of the UC Berkeley School of Law in 1983 as director of the Earl Warren Legal Institute, a position he held until 2002. He was appointed the first Wolfen Distinguished Scholar in 2006 and served in that capacity until 2013.

Writings
Zimring has written several books on topics such as capital punishment and drug control. He has also published a number of academic papers, including one in the University of Chicago Law Review in 1968 on gun control which found that both gun and knife attacks were both typically unplanned and with no intent to kill, but if a gun was available, it was more likely that the victim would die. In 1999, he (along with Gordon Hawkins) wrote the book Crime Is Not the Problem, which argues that the United States does not have a problem with crime overall, but does have a problem with lethal crime, relative to other countries. In 2011, he wrote the book The City that Became Safe, which is about the decline in New York City's crime rate and its causes. In 2017, his book When Police Kill was published by Harvard University Press. The book explores the fact that over 1,000 Americans are killed by police each year. For example, it examines racial disparities in these killings, and concludes that these disparities are not due to higher crime rates in black neighborhoods.

Views
According to the Washington Post's Max Ehrenfreund, Zimring believes the recent decline in crime rates in New York City was larger than in other American cities largely because of the recruitment of more police officers. Zimring has said that a proposed exemption to the California law banning local communities from regulating guns, but only in Oakland, could "test the waters of local control and to see whether the political process that produces city-level gun policy can get inclusive and responsible, and whether it can get specific and selective in ways that can solve the problem." In a 2015 opinion piece in the New York Daily News, he criticized claims by Heather Mac Donald that the Ferguson effect was responsible for a recent increase in crime rates in the United States, calling the proposed effect "fiction" and said that the evidence at the time suggested that there was "probably not" a "nationwide crime wave" of the sort Mac Donald claimed existed.

Honors and awards
Zimring's awards include the Edwin H. Sutherland Award (2007) and August Vollmer Award (2006), both from the American Society of Criminology. In 1995, he received the Donald Cressey Award from the National Council on Crime and Delinquency, as well as a Guggenheim Fellowship.

Personal life
In 1967, Zimring married Susan Hilty. They have two adult children: Carl and Daniel. He later remarried to Michal Crawford, to whom he was still married as of April 2015.

References

External links
Faculty profile

1942 births
Living people
UC Berkeley School of Law faculty
Lawyers from Los Angeles
Wayne State University alumni
University of Chicago Law School alumni
American criminologists
Winners of the Stockholm Prize in Criminology